The Una was one of the first feminist periodicals owned, written, and edited entirely by women. Launched in Providence, Rhode Island by Paulina Kellogg Wright Davis in February 1853, it eventually relocated to Boston. "Out of great heart of nature seek we truth" was the quote in volume 1 number 1.

History
In 1853, The Una, a paper devoted to the enfranchisement of woman, owned and edited by Paulina Wright Davis, was first published in Providence, Rhode Island. The Una was the first paper focused on woman suffrage, and the first distinctively woman's rights journal ever published. Its mystical name signified "truth", to be used as a constant suggestion of fidelity to all. The Una had many notable correspondents such as William H. Channing, Elizabeth Peabody, Thomas Wentworth Higginson, Rev. A. D. Mayo, Dr. William Elder, Ednah D. Cheney, Caroline H. Dall, Fanny Fern, Elizabeth Oakes Smith, Frances D. Gage, Hannah Tracy Cutler, Abby H. Price, Marion Finch, of Liverpool, Hon. John Neal, of Portland, Lucy Stone, and Elizabeth Cady Stanton. For nearly three years Davis continued The Una, doing so entirely at her own expense. It took the broadest ground claimed of that day: individual freedom in the State, the Church, and the home; woman's equality and suffrage as a natural right. 

After the paper removed to the Boston publisher S. C. Hewitt, Caroline Healey Dall became associate editor, and for some time, assisted in the editorial department, where it continued to be published until October 1855. Davis viewed The Una as a reform journal, while Dall wanted to advance it as a literary journal. Its counterparts were Genius of Liberty and The Lily.

See also
 Die Deutsche Frauen-Zeitung
The Lily
List of feminist periodicals in the United States
List of suffragists and suffragettes
 Timeline of women's suffrage
Women's suffrage in Rhode Island
 Women's suffrage in the United States
 Women's suffrage organizations and publications

References

 Encarta Encyclopedia: 2006 edition.

Attribution

Bibliography

External links
 All three volumes of The Una, courtesy of the Boston Athenaeum.
 Image of volume 1, number 1, February 1, 1853. (Half-way down the page)

Defunct political magazines published in the United States
Feminism in the United States
Feminist magazines
Magazines established in 1853
Magazines disestablished in 1855
Magazines published in Boston
Magazines published in Rhode Island
Mass media in Providence, Rhode Island
Women in Massachusetts
Women in Rhode Island
Women's suffrage publications in the United States
Rhode Island suffrage